David Augustus Hughes III (born June 1, 1959) is a former professional American football player from Kailua, Hawaii.  He played six seasons in the National Football League, the first five with the Seattle Seahawks (1981–1985) and the final one with the Pittsburgh Steelers.  As a fullback he was primarily a blocker, gaining just over 1,000 yards in his pro career.

Early years 
The son of David Hughes Jr. and  Dorothy (Kim-Kruetter) Hughes, Hughes was born in Honolulu and raised in Kailua, on the windward side of Oahu.  He has two sisters (Debbie and Diane) and one brother (Dean). When Hughes was eleven, his father died.

Hughes said his father's death had an impact.  "I fell away from my family," said Hughes. "In junior high and high school I got involved with drugs and alcohol. I thought I was pretty cool. But inside I was very unhappy."

Hughes attended the Kamehameha Schools in Honolulu and graduated in 1977.  He was a standout athlete at Kamehameha, receiving letters in football, basketball, and track. In football, Hughes was a member of three consecutive Oahu Prep Bowl and Interscholastic League of Honolulu championship teams. As a senior in the fall of 1976, he was named football offensive player of the year for the state of Hawaii.

Boise State
Hughes played college football at Boise State from 1977 to 1980, starting at fullback all four years and tallying 1,826 rushing yards (5.2 yards per carry).  As a sophomore in 1978, he was named to the All Big Sky Conference first-team, and also received honorable mention on the AP Division II All-America team.

Hughes, quarterback Joe Aliotti, and halfbacks Cedric Minter and Terry Zahner were christened Boise's "Four Horsemen," and the quartet played key roles as seniors on the Broncos team that won the NCAA Division I-AA title in 1980. Minter and Hughes were also chosen to play in the 1980 East–West Shrine Game. Hughes is a member of the Boise State University Athletics Hall of Fame and in 2005 was named the first-team fullback on the Boise State Bronco 35 team, which honored the top BSU football players from 1970 to 2005.

NFL career
In the 1981 NFL Draft, Hughes was picked in the second round (31st overall) by the Seattle Seahawks. He was a member of the 1983 team that made it to the NFL playoffs for the first time in franchise history.  He was second on the team in rushing that season with 327 yards. In his six years in the NFL, Hughes totaled 1,041 yards rushing, 864 yards receiving, and 663 yards in kickoff returns. He has seven career touchdowns.  While playing for Pittsburgh in 1986, a knee injury ended his playing career.

After football
In 1983, Hughes met Kalua Kaiahua from Napili and had a spiritual experience where there was an "opening the doors of faith in God.". After his NFL career ended, Hughes became active in religious ministry. In 1994, he and his family returned to Idaho and settled in Eagle, adjacent to Boise. There he pursued his ministry and served as running backs coach for Eagle High School, the Class A-1 (Division II) state champions in 1998.

Hughes and his ohana (family) relocated to the Seattle area in 1999 to accept a position on staff at Antioch Bible Church in suburban Redmond. He also volunteered as an assistant football coach at Eastlake High School, where he taught his players the "highest values… of sportsmanship, team play and doing [their] best in sports as in life." Hughes served as the Mission pastor for Antioch Bible Church (a non-denomination church) in Redmond for almost 14 years before stepping away to start a ministry in the inner city area of Seattle. He currently assists the football team at Rainier Beach High School, and still is in the weight room every day. His ministry, Paraclete 46, focuses on urban student athletes and their families in providing resources and guidance.

Personal life
While a senior at Boise State University, Hughes married Holly Ann Mahealani Haleamau on February 14, 1981. They have five children: Lahela, Kela, Keoni, Kaniela, and I`okepa.

Notes

Sources
"David Hughes: Who's the most important person in your life?" TheGoal.com. 15 March 2004. http://www.thegoal.com/players/football/hughes_david/hughes_david.html
Kaopuiki, Danny.  "The David Hughes Story, from Football star to Ambassador of God…"  Northwest Hawaii Times. Oct 2005. http://www.northwesthawaiitimes.com/kpoct05.htm
Romero, Jose Miguel. "Catching up with David Hughes." The Seattle Times. 8 Nov. 2003. http://community.seattletimes.nwsource.com/archive/?date=20031108&slug=oldhawk08

External links

Database Football.com – David Hughes
NFL statistics – David Hughes
Boise State University Athletics Hall of Fame – David Hughes

1959 births
Players of American football from Honolulu
American football fullbacks
Boise State Broncos football players
Kamehameha Schools alumni
Seattle Seahawks players
Pittsburgh Steelers players
Living people
Sportspeople from Redmond, Washington
People from Eagle, Idaho